Spunk may in colloquial English mean either courage or semen. It may otherwise refer to:

Music
 Spunk (Sex Pistols bootleg album), a 1977 bootleg album by the Sex Pistols
 Spunk/This Is Crap, a 1996 re-issue of Spunk by the Sex Pistols
 Spunk!, a 1993 album by Swamp Zombies
 Spunk (play), a 1989 play by American playwright George C. Wolfe

Internet
 Spunk Library, an anarchist internet archive
 Spunk.nl, a Dutch e-zine

Other
 Spunk (candy), a brand of salty liquorice and wine gums from Denmark
 Spunk Creek, a stream in Minnesota
 The pseudonym of Joan Stark, an ASCII artist
 A 1927 short story by Zora Neale Hurston